Catcune Castle was a castle around  south of Gorebridge, north of the Gore Water, in Midlothian, Scotland.

History

This was originally a property of the Borthwick family; it passed to the Sinclairs, who probably built the castle.  The lands of Catcune are mentioned in 1527 and 1652.  By 1908 the castle is reported to have been very ruinous; by 1954 reduced to the rock outcrop it was built on; by 1975 there was said to be no trace of it in a pasture field.

Structure

The castle was an L-plan tower house, standing on a rock outcrop.

There were three vaulted cellars on the ground floor.

References

Castles in Midlothian
Clan Sinclair